is a tactical role-playing game developed by Intelligent Systems and published by Nintendo for the Nintendo Switch. It is an installment in the Fire Emblem series and was released on January 20, 2023.

Fire Emblem Engage received generally positive reviews from critics, who praised the gameplay innovations, score, and visuals but felt that the story and social sim elements were underdeveloped compared to its predecessor, Fire Emblem: Three Houses.

Gameplay
Gameplay is similar to previous games in the series, but with the addition of Emblem Rings that allow units to fight alongside the lords of previous Fire Emblem games.

Plot

Setting
Engage is set on the continent of Elyos and features previous protagonists of the series that can be summoned as spirits called "Emblems" with Emblem Rings.

Alear, a divine dragon, is awoken from a one thousand year slumber to help defeat the Fell Dragon Sombron by gathering the Emblem Rings spread across Elyos.

Synopsis
One thousand years ago, the evil Fell Dragon Sombron was sealed away by the Divine Dragon Lumera, but during the fighting Lumera's child Alear is gravely wounded and put into a slumber. One thousand years later, Alear finally awakens from their slumber and briefly reunites with Lumera. However, Alear has lost most of their memories prior to falling asleep, and can only remember how to use their Emblem Ring, which can summon the spirit Emblem Marth to assist them in battle. In addition, undead creatures called Corrupted begin to appear all across Elyos, signaling the return of Sombron. Lumera's castle is then suddenly attacked by an army from the Kingdom of Elusia, who seek to revive Sombron. The Elusians manage to steal most of Lumera's Emblem Rings and Lumera sacrifices herself to protect Alear from a sorceress' attack.

With Lumera's passing, Alear resolves to take up her mantle as the Divine Dragon and protect Elyros. With their companions, Alear ventures out and assists the Kingdoms of Firene and Brodia against attacks from Elusia, as well as recover several more Emblem Rings. Along the way, Alear also befriends a young girl named Veyle. Alear eventually confronts King Hyacinth of Elusia, but fails to stop him from reviving Sombron, who devours Hyacinth. Veyle then reveals she was the real mastermind behind unsealing Sombron, as well as being his daughter and the sorceress responsible for killing Lumera. She then steals all of the Emblem Rings Alear and their companions possess, allowing Sombron to corrupt them to his side. Without the Emblem Rings, Alear and their companions are forced to flee for their lives. They are assisted by Princess Ivy of Elusia, who decides to join Alear and gives them Elusia's two Emblem Rings.

Alear and their companions head to the Queendom of Solm to regroup and recruit more allies and Emblem Rings. They begin to combat Sombron's generals, the Four Hounds: Zephia, Griss, Mauvier, and Marni. They also discover that Veyle is in fact being controlled by Sombron through an evil split personality. During a battle, the real Veyle is able to temporarily break free of Sombron's control and returns one of the Emblem Rings to Alear before being taken away by the Four Hounds. Alear continues their pursuit of Sombron and the Four Hounds, but eventually learns to their dismay that they are actually Sombron's child. One thousand years ago, Alear rebelled against Sombron and was adopted by Lumera, who had steadily transferred her own Divine Dragon powers into Alear while they were asleep. Despite being born a Fell Dragon, Alear can still call upon the power of the Divine Dragon to seal away Sombron. Meanwhile, Mauvier and Marni defect to Alear's side in order to save Veyle, who is Alear's sister. They also warn Alear that Sombron intends to invade the Land of Lythos and revive his own land of Gradlon, from which he can take over not just Elyos, but other worlds as well.

Alear is forced to confront Veyle once again, but Marni sacrifices herself to damage the helmet controlling Veyle, which restores her true personality. Sombron then attacks Veyle, with Alear sacrificing themselves to protect her. With Alear dead, Sombron drains the power of the Emblem Rings and restores the land of Gradlon. Veyle's evil personality then reasserts control and she attacks Alear's companions. Meanwhile, Alear's spirit meets Veyle's in the afterlife, and they convince Veyle to retake control of her body and revive them as a Corrupted. Veyle permanently banishes her evil side and revives Corrupted Alear, who is able to retain their sanity and reactivate the Emblem Rings before their body crumbles away from the strain. However, the 12 Emblems, inspired by Alear's desire to keep fighting to save the world, unanimously agree to sacrifice most of their power to revive Alear as the 13th Emblem.

After regrouping, Alear and Veyle lead their companions to destroy Sombron's Fell Dragon Shards to break the barrier protecting him. They end up defeating and killing Zephia and Griss in the process, though Zephia gives them a crystal to reach the next Fell Dragon Shard before she dies. Alear uses the crystal, but finds that has actually transported them a thousand years into the past where they meet their past self and is forced to fight them. Alear defeats their past self and destroys the Shard, unwittingly setting up events for their past self to meet Lumera for the first time. Alear then proceeds to the final Shard, which is guarded by Lumera revived as a Corrupted. Alear defeats Corrupted Lumera and manages to have parting words in her last moments when she regains her sanity.

As Alear and their companions proceed to the final confrontation with Sombron, Emblem Marth reveals that closing the portal Sombron has opened will cut off Elyos from the other worlds, meaning the other Emblems will cease to exist. Regardless, Alear presses on and confronts Sombron, who reveals he was exiled to Elyos from another world, and wishes to recover the Zero Emblem so he can return to his homeworld and take revenge. Alear and their companions kill Sombron and close the portal, putting an end to his ambitions, through Alear is forced to say goodbye to the Emblems as they disappear. Afterwards, Alear's companions return to their respective kingdoms to help rebuild Elyos while Alear succeeds Lumera as the new Divine Dragon Monarch.

In a post-credits scene, as Alear is preparing for their coronation ceremony, it is revealed that the Emblem Rings still retain some of their power and Emblem Marth muses that the Emblems and Alear will meet again someday.

Development
According to Tsutomu Tei, game director from Intelligent Systems, Engage has story structure simplified compared to the previous title in the series, Fire Emblem: Three Houses, focusing in only one major goal so that players can focus on tactical gameplay. Genki Yokota, producer from Nintendo EPD Group No. 2 says that while multiple story paths can be interesting for a game, players might feel its overwhelming, so for this title, they decided on not having more than one path to be played, instead having a focus on one path.

The idea of the Emblem system according to Kenta Nakanishi, director from Nintendo EPD Group No. 2, came up when the developers were discussing about the marriage system from previous titles such as Fire Emblem: Genealogy of the Holy War, Fire Emblem Awakening and Fire Emblem Fates, and as those games had a marriage system where the kids of the marriage inherit the abilities of the parents, the developers decided to create the emblem system to make the pairing more casual while also inserting the characters from previous games and merging them with other characters for experimentation.

Regarding the art of the game, director Tsutomu says that they were looking out for an artist with a design style which could appeal to a broader audience, including younger players, as well as having the ability to do many types of designs for the characters for the direction of a flashy direction they wanted to go in general. Among the candidates, it was Mika Pikazo, a famous illustrator in Japan since the 2010s she has worked on various genres of artwork including character design, logo and merchandise design for apparel brands, cover art for novels and CD album covers. The developers wanted Pikazo due to her vivid, vibrant and popping colors which they found to be a perfect fit to the game they wanted to make. According to the director, it was an unanimous decision from the development team to hire Pikazo for these reasons, with the artist accepting it as she was also a big fan of the franchise. Due to the amount of detail and colors of Pikazo's art, the 3D model team had difficult to bring it to life in 3D, to the point it was suggested to use the 2D art for dialogues like in previous games in the series, but in the end the team was able make it closer to the original illustrations after a hard work trying to make the models similar to it.

Unlike in previous games, which used custom engines, Engage is built in Unity, and is one of the few Nintendo published titles to not use a custom internal engine.

Release
The game was first announced in a 13 September 2022 Nintendo Direct. A "Divine Edition" of the game was also announced, including an artbook, poster, steelbook case, and art cards depicting the previous protagonists who can be summoned with the Emblem Rings including Marth from Fire Emblem: Shadow Dragon and the Blade of Light and Celica from Fire Emblem Gaiden. On November 16, a story trailer was released, revealing story details including Alear's promise to their late mother and a dark version of Marth.
The following week, Nintendo uploaded a gameplay trailer showcasing new characters and more returning protagonists from the series. In addition to Marth and Celica, Sigurd from Fire Emblem: Genealogy of the Holy War, Lyn from Fire Emblem: The Blazing Blade, Corrin from Fire Emblem Fates, and Byleth from Fire Emblem: Three Houses were also confirmed to be returning.

During The Game Awards 2022, a new trailer was shown announcing an Expansion Pass for the game. The first wave was set for release alongside the game and includes Edelgard, Dimitri, and Claude from Fire Emblem: Three Houses and Tiki from Fire Emblem: Shadow Dragon and the Blade of Light appearing as Emblems. Three more waves of content will be included in the Expansion Pass and will be released throughout 2023. Additionally, the remaining Emblems for the base game were revealed as Leif from Fire Emblem: Thracia 776, Roy from Fire Emblem: The Binding Blade, Eirika and Ephraim from Fire Emblem: The Sacred Stones, Ike from Fire Emblem: Path of Radiance, Micaiah from Fire Emblem: Radiant Dawn, and Lucina from Fire Emblem Awakening.

On December 12, a tie-in "A Hero Rises" voting event with Fire Emblem Heroes was announced focusing on the twelve characters featured as Emblems in Engage with voting remaining open until December 25. On December 15, Nintendo released a trailer revealing Somniel, a location visited between battles similar to Garreg Mach Monastery from Three Houses. Numerous activities in Somniel were shown off including Emblem Ring management, working out, fishing, dining, and battling in an arena. The game released on January 20, 2023. Later that day, a manga adaptation by Kazurō Kyō was announced to begin serialization in Shueisha's Saikyō Jump magazine and Shōnen Jump+ website on March 3, 2023, with a prologue releasing the month prior.

In a Nintendo Direct on February 8, 2023, Hector from Fire Emblem: The Blazing Blade, Soren from Fire Emblem: Path of Radiance, and Camilla from Fire Emblem Fates were announced as Emblems in Wave 2 of the Expansion Pass, which released later that day. Additionally, Wave 3 was announced to include Chrom and Robin from Fire Emblem Awakening and Veronica from Fire Emblem Heroes as Emblems with the fourth and final wave containing a new story titled "Fell Xenologue". On March 3, the first chapter of the manga adaptation was released in Saikyō Jump magazine and Shōnen Jump+ while Wave 3 of the expansion pass was revealed to be available on March 8.

Reception

Critical reception

Fire Emblem Engage has received "generally favorable" reviews holding an aggregate score of 80/100 on Metacritic, based on 121 reviews.

Polygon praised the addition of the ring system as "one of the most flexible progression systems the series has ever implemented", but criticized the game's story as "terrible". Nintendo World Report similarly noted the plot was a bit threadbare in comparison to previous entries, but liked Engage'''s cast of characters, saying it "has one of my favorite casts in the franchise, with a number of characters that are fleshed out very well in support conversations". IGN enjoyed the game's implementation of fanservice, "There's a reverence for Fire Emblems past that is clear in every aspect of it".

The game's lack of social depth and branching paths was highlighted as a negative by Will Greenwald writing for PCMag. The minigames in the game also received criticism for being tiring, repetitive and not changing much in the game at large by Giovanni Colantonio writing for Digital Trends.

SalesFire Emblem Engage'' was the bestselling retail game during its first week of release in Japan, with 144,558 physical copies being sold across the country.

Notes

References

External links
 Official Site (US)
 Official Site (UK)
 Official Site (JP)

 2023 manga
 2023 video games
Engage
Nintendo Switch games
Nintendo Switch-only games
Shōnen manga
Shueisha manga
Tactical role-playing video games
Video games about amnesia
Video games developed in Japan
Video games that use Amiibo figurines
Video games featuring protagonists of selectable gender
War video games